Operose Peak is a peak above Onnum Valley to the southwest of Derrick Peak in the Britannia Range of Antarctica. The steep lower slopes of the peak are of Beacon sandstone; the top (2130 m) is made up of a thick dolerite sill. The Latin name means laborious or requiring great pain reflecting the steepness of the slopes.

References 

Mountains of Oates Land